Vanya on 42nd Street is a 1994 American film directed by Louis Malle, written by Andre Gregory, and starring Wallace Shawn and Julianne Moore. The film is an intimate, interpretive performance of the 1899 play Uncle Vanya by Anton Chekhov as adapted by David Mamet.

Premise
Actors in New York City rehearse Uncle Vanya in a dilapidated theatre.

Cast

The film also features Madhur Jaffrey and Andre Gregory as himself. Shawn, Gregory, and Malle had previously collaborated on the 1981 film My Dinner with Andre. Several actors known to the New York stage are featured, including George Gaynes, Larry Pine, Phoebe Brand, Brooke Smith, and Lynn Cohen.

Moore, whose film career was gaining critical attention because of her performance in Short Cuts, was prominently featured in the advertising campaign for the film.

The soundtrack features music by the Joshua Redman Quartet, with Redman on tenor saxophone, Brad Mehldau on piano, Christian McBride on bass, and Brian Blade on drums.

Production
Over the course of three years, director Andre Gregory and a group of actors came together on a voluntary basis in order to better understand Chekhov's work through performance workshops.  Staged and filmed entirely within the vacant shell of the then-abandoned New Amsterdam Theater on 42nd Street in New York City, they enacted the play rehearsal-style on a bare stage with the actors in street clothes. Free from any commercial demands, their performances were for an invited audience only. Gregory and director Louis Malle decided to document the play as they had developed it. The film was the result of the collaborative process. It was the last film of Malle's career.

Filming
Workshop rehearsals with Gregory and the cast originally took place at the abandoned Victory Theater on 42nd Street in New York City. The filmed version was shot entirely within the New Amsterdam Theatre, also on 42nd Street. Built in 1903, the theatre was the original home of the Ziegfeld Follies, a historical tidbit mentioned in the film during some pre-show banter. In the late 1930s, the New Amsterdam Theatre was transformed into a movie palace. The theatre remained a movie palace until it "temporarily" closed in 1982.

At the time Vanya on 42nd Street was filmed, the theatre had been abandoned for over ten years and was in a state of severe disrepair. Rats had chewed through much of the stage rigging, and flooding and mice made the stage unusable, so that they were restricted to a section of what had been the orchestra.

For the film production, some rows of seats were removed and a small platform was built for the cast and film crew. Shortly after the production of Vanya, the New Amsterdam was leased to The Walt Disney Company.  Disney restored the theatre to its grand original design and reopened it in 1997.

Reception

Critical response 
Vanya on 42nd Street received mostly positive reviews from critics. On the review aggregator website Rotten Tomatoes, the film has an 89% approval rating, based on 37 reviews. The website's consensus reads, "Beautiful performances and the subtle hand of master Louis Malle make this adaptation of Chekov's Uncle Vanya an eccentric presentation of an enduring classic." Roger Ebert gave the film three-and-a-half out of four stars in his review for the Chicago Sun-Times. "As he did with My Dinner with Andre", Ebert wrote, "[Malle shows] he is the master of a visual style suited to tightly-encompassed material. There is not a shot that calls attention to itself, and yet not a shot that is without thought."

Year-end lists 
 1st – Peter Rainer, Los Angeles Times
 2nd – Stephen Hunter, The Baltimore Sun
 2nd – Michael Mills, The Palm Beach Post
 3rd – Bob Strauss, Los Angeles Daily News
 5th – Kevin Thomas, Los Angeles Times
 5th – David Elliott, The San Diego Union-Tribune
 7th – Gene Siskel, The Chicago Tribune
 9th – Kenneth Turan, Los Angeles Times
 9th – Robert Denerstein, Rocky Mountain News
 Top 10 (listed alphabetically, not ranked) – Mike Clark, USA Today
 Top 10 (not ranked) – Betsy Pickle, Knoxville News-Sentinel
 Top 10 runner-ups (not ranked) – Janet Maslin, The New York Times
 Honorable mention –  Glenn Lovell, San Jose Mercury News
 Honorable mention – William Arnold, Seattle Post-Intelligencer

References

External links
 
 
 
 
 
Vanya on 42nd Street: An American Vanya an essay by Steven Vineberg at the Criterion Collection

1994 films
1994 romantic drama films
Films based on Uncle Vanya
Films directed by Louis Malle
Films shot in New York City
1990s English-language films
Films with screenplays by Wallace Shawn